Wojciech Stępień (born 6 July 1970) is a former Polish volleyball player, a member of Polish national team in 1994, coach.

External links 
  Agata Kołacz: Oby więcej takich przypadków! - wywiad z Wojciechem Stępniem SportRadom.pl [2013-09-20]

1970 births
Polish men's volleyball players
Czarni Radom players
Living people
People from Opole Lubelskie County
Czarni Radom coaches